The 2016 Hungarian Fencing Championships were the 111th edition of the Hungarian Fencing Championships, which took place on 25–27 November 2016 at the Gerevich Aladár Nemzeti Sportcsarnok in Budapest.

Schedule

Results

Men's

References

External links
Official website of the Hungarian Fencing Association

Hungarian Fencing Championships
Fencing Championships
Hungarian Fencing Championships